Heliothis transvaalica is a species of moth of the family Noctuidae first described by William Lucas Distant in 1902. It is found in Transvaal of South Africa and in Namibia.

This species has a wingspan of 28–30 mm.

References

External links
 

Heliothis
Moths described in 1902
Moths of Africa
Taxa named by William Lucas Distant